Mapopolis has been the creator of PDA/smartphone GPS navigation software Mapopolis Navigator.  Mapopolis used data from Navteq.  Starting in 1999, Mapopolis first released software for the Palm OS and later added software for Pocket PC handhelds and Windows smartphones. Mapopolis created the first real-time traffic service (Mapopolis ClearRoute), which provided real-time route updates based on traffic conditions.

As of April 1, 2007, Mapopolis has discontinued sales of its consumer software. Map downloads remained available for at least one year past that date for registered users who purchased the product and still did not use up their full 1-year allowance.

Mapopolis Navigator files use a proprietary format and make it impossible for users to export their custom POIs.

Sources

Satellite navigation software
Personal digital assistant software
Navigation system companies